Ingeo is trademarked brand name for a range of polylactic acid (PLA) biopolymers owned by NatureWorks.

The process to create Ingeo uses the carbon stored in plants by photosynthesis in the form of dextrose sugar. The carbon and other elements in these sugars are then used to make a biopolymer through a process of fermentation and separation. The resulting resin can, then be injection molded into plastics goods, extruded for film applications, thermoformed into packaging, or extruded for use in textiles applications.

PLA is more resistant to ultraviolet light than most other synthetics such as low density polyethylene (LDPE). It has relatively low flammability and smoke generation.  Because it is more hydrophobic than common polyester fibers, when blended with cotton and wool, the biopolymer results in lighter garments that repel moisture.

The biopolymer is also used in packaging manufacturing, including bottles for mineral water, that can be found already on the market (e.g. in Italy). Applications can be clear, opaque, flexible, or rigid. The biopolymer is similar to polystyrene, and exhibits tensile strength and modulus comparable to hydrocarbon-based thermoplastics. Much like polyester, it resists grease and oil, and offers flavor and odor barrier. Ingeo provides heat sealability at temperatures equivalent to polyolefin sealant resins.

Resinex Group distributes Ingeo in Europe.

See also 
 Bioplastics
 Biodegradable plastic

References

Synthetic fibers